Gustavo Nacarato Veronesi (born 7 May 1982, in Alagoinhas) is a retired Brazilian football player. In 2010 he played for Rapid București in Liga I.

References

External links
 Player profile on AO Kerkyra official site
 Player stats on Guardian
 
 

1982 births
Living people
Brazilian footballers
Brazilian expatriate footballers
Association football defenders
People from Alagoinhas
Botafogo de Futebol e Regatas players
CR Vasco da Gama players
Clube Atlético Juventus players
A.P.O. Akratitos Ano Liosia players
FC Rapid București players
A.O. Kerkyra players
Super League Greece players
Liga I players
Expatriate footballers in France
Expatriate footballers in Greece
Expatriate footballers in Romania
Expatriate footballers in Portugal
Brazilian expatriate sportspeople in France
Brazilian expatriate sportspeople in Greece
Brazilian expatriate sportspeople in Romania
Brazilian expatriate sportspeople in Portugal
Botafogo Futebol Clube (SP) players
Association football midfielders
Sportspeople from Bahia